The Pueblo Braves were a minor league baseball team that was located in Pueblo, Colorado and played in the Western League from 1928 to 1932. They were known as the Pueblo Steelworkers for their first two seasons.

External links
Baseball Reference

Defunct baseball teams in Colorado
Defunct Western League teams
Baseball teams established in 1928
Baseball teams disestablished in 1932
Sports in Pueblo, Colorado
1928 establishments in Colorado
1932 disestablishments in Colorado